West Hartford is an unincorporated community in Ralls County, in the U.S. state of Missouri.

History
A post office called West Hartford was established in 1870, and remained in operation until 1902. The community takes its name from Hartford, Connecticut, the native home of a first settler.

References

Unincorporated communities in Ralls County, Missouri
Unincorporated communities in Missouri